The Belarusian Cup is the national ice hockey cup competition in Belarus. It has been contested annually since 2002.

Winners
 2021: HC Dinamo Minsk
 2020: HC Dinamo Minsk
 2019: Yunost Minsk
 2018: HK Neman Grodno
 2017: HK Homiel
 2016: HK Neman Grodno
 2015: Yunost Minsk
 2014: HK Neman Grodno
 2013: Yunost Minsk
 2012: HK Homiel
 2011: Metallurg Zhlobin
 2010: Yunost Minsk
 2009: Yunost Minsk
 2008: Keramin Minsk
 2007: HK Homiel
 2006: HC Dinamo Minsk
 2005: HC Dinamo Minsk
 2004: Yunost Minsk
 2003: HK Homiel
 2002: Keramin Minsk

External links
 Belarus Ice Hockey Federation

Cup
National ice hockey cup competitions in Europe